Believe... In Holiday Magic is a holiday fireworks show at the Disneyland Resort in Anaheim, California, launched in 2000. The show runs for much of the Disneyland Resort's holiday season, which typically runs from the second weekend of November to the first weekend of the following January.

The show
Opening

The show begins with a young woman (as of the 2007 Christmas season) encouraging everyone to remember and believe in holiday magic:
"Does your heart hold the magic of the holidays? Is it filled with warm memories just waiting to be discovered again? Now is the time to open your heart, believe in that magic, and remember those treasured moments...they're still there, deep within you, waiting to touch you once more. So come along as the magic of the seasons leads the way."

As of the 2007 season, the narrator was changed from an old woman's voice to a new younger voice which is believed to be Kellie Coffey.
There has been a change in some of the narration, The new voice does not include "Well now is the time to open your heart.."
or "Oh.. They're still there.."

Can You Remember

The song "Can You Remember", performed by country singer Kellie Coffey, begins after the woman finishes her speech. The lyrics are a Christmas version of the song "Remember the Magic", the theme song from Walt Disney World's 25th anniversary celebration performed by Brian McKnight.

Traditional Holiday Music

Following "Can You Remember" is the fanfare from the Mickey Mouse Club March, then instrumental excerpts from various Christmas carols and a Hanukkah song, including: "March of the Wooden Soldiers,""Toyland, Toyland,""I Have a Little Dreidel,""All I Want For Christmas Is My Two Front Teeth,""I'll Be Home for Christmas,""O Holy Night,""We Three Kings,""Joy to the World,""Silent Night,""Carol of the Bells,""Russian Dance (Nutcracker Suite),""Arabian Dance (Nutcracker Suite)," and "The Christmas Song."

Pyrotechnics Conclusion

After the excerpt from "The Christmas Song" is the conclusion to "Can You Remember", now sung by a chorus led by the female vocalist.

A short excerpt from "Have Yourself A Merry Little Christmas" accompanies the final line of "Can You Remember." The woman's voice then says, "Cherish the holidays forever, and always believe", and concludes the pyrotechnics portion of the show.

White Christmas and Conclusion

The lights then return to normal and "magic snow" falls on guests on Main Street, USA, Small World Mall, and the Fantasmic! viewing area while a rendition of "White Christmas" plays. This rendition is performed by Kellie Coffey. The show concludes with the end of "White Christmas." In 2005 holiday seasons, while Disneyland continue performing Remember... Dreams Come True, This song and "magic snow" falls also included with short introduction by Julie Andrews.

In 2007, Disney added over 80,000 LEDs onto Sleeping Beauty Castle to make it look like the castle has snow. In addition to that three snowfalls happen each night, one at the lighting of the castle, another after the nighttime parade, and the final one during the White Christmas segment of Believe... In Holiday Magic. Each Snowfall can be seen on Main Street, USA, Small World Mall, and the Fantasmic! viewing area.

History
In 2000, Disneyland premiered a fireworks show called Believe... There's Magic in the Stars to celebrate its 45th anniversary. The show was so successful in its first couple of months that Disney decided to premiere a holiday version the following holiday season. This version used music from various classic Christmas songs together in order to create a thirteen-minute fireworks spectacular. The holiday version was very popular, especially the finale which culminated in "snow" falling in various areas of the park.

Believe... In Holiday Magic has run every holiday season since 2000, with the exception of the 2005 and 2015 holiday season, when Disney opted to continue performing Remember... Dreams Come True in observance of the Disneyland Resort's 50th anniversary and  Disneyland Forever in observance of the Disneyland Resort's 60th Diamond Celebration.

In returning the show for the 2006 holiday season, Disney has updated it to include some of the pyrotechnic effects presented in Remember.... Most notable is the increased amount of pyrotechnics launched from Sleeping Beauty Castle. On November 16, 2007, new special effects were added to Sleeping Beauty Castle to be seen in Believe... In Holiday Magic. In the 2010 holiday season, castle lighting was changed and searchlights used for Magical and Halloween Screams were added into the show.

For the 2016 holiday season, following the conclusion of Disneyland's 60th Diamond Celebration, projection mapping on Sleeping Beauty Castle was added for certain segments of this show using the same technology that was installed for Disneyland Forever. The searchlights that appear on either side of Sleeping Beauty Castle, which were also installed for Disneyland Forever (initially using Magical searchlights technology) were also implemented in certain portions of this show beginning in the 2016 holiday season.

In 2017, the Main Street USA projections and Rivers of America water screen, also installed for Disneyland Forever, were also implemented in the show.

Prior to 2018 holiday season, on nights when Believe... In Holiday Magic is cancelled due to winds or other reasons a brief introduction of Wintertime Enchantment then snowfall still occurs, so only the finale part is shown.

In 2018 holiday season, a new version of the show with significantly reduced high fireworks and more low level pyrotechnics was shown. This version only shown if there was winds or other reason formerly cause the show to be cancelled. This precedent is later used in 2019 run of Disneyland Forever and Halloween Screams.

Also in 2018, water fountains and searchlights which installed in Rivers of America since Pixar Fest fireworks spectacular Together Forever was utilized in the show.

In 2019 holiday season, the show has returned with some of the elements formerly presented for Mickey's Mix Magic and recently returned Disneyland Forever, which most notable of that is the increased amount of small-sized firework shells on top of the rooftops of It's a Small World and Mickey & Minnie's Runaway Railway.

The show was cancelled for 2020 in response to the COVID-19 pandemic and the ongoing closure of Disneyland Park amid a regional stay at home order issued by California Governor Gavin Newsom. A year later, the show returned.

Soundtrack 
There was an officially released CD for the soundtrack to Believe... In Holiday Magic. The album is called Holiday Magic. The CD also included two other tracks: one for the holiday-themed version of "It's A Small World" entitled "it's a small world" Holiday, and Disney's LuminAria which was a low-level fireworks show on Paradise Bay at Disney California Adventure Park in Anaheim, California.

Track Listing 
1. "Believe... In Holiday Magic" Fireworks Spectacular (13:26) 

2. "it's a small world" Holiday (15:10)

3. Disney's LuminAria (16:26)

Production 
Album Compiled by: Randy Thornton
Production Assistant: Sarah Harris
Album Art Direction: Jordan Foley

Barcode: 050086006076

See also 
 Believe... There's Magic in the Stars
 Celebrate! Tokyo Disneyland
 Disney Dreams! Of Christmas
 Disney Gifts of Christmas
 Disneyland Forever
 Remember... Dreams Come True
 Holiday Wishes
 World of Color: Season of Light

References

External links 
 Official site

Walt Disney Parks and Resorts fireworks
Disneyland